The Moorings 335 is an American sailboat that was designed for Moorings Yacht Charter and first built in 1988.

The Moorings 335 is a development of the Hunter 33.5 specially for the charter market, with a shorter length overall, but longer waterline length and lighter displacement.

Production
The design was built for Moorings by Hunter Marine in the United States, but it is now out of production. The design is no longer in service with Moorings and the fleet has been sold for private use.

Design
The Moorings 335 is a recreational keelboat, built predominantly of fiberglass. It has a fractional sloop rig, an internally-mounted spade-type rudder controlled by a wheel and a fixed fin keel. It displaces  and carries  of ballast.

See also
List of sailing boat types

Related development
Hunter 33.5
Hunter 333
Moorings 295

Similar sailboats
Abbott 33
Alajuela 33
C&C 3/4 Ton
C&C 33
C&C 101
C&C SR 33
CS 33
Endeavour 33
Hunter 33
Hunter 33-2004
Hunter 336
Hunter 340
Marlow-Hunter 33
Mirage 33
Nonsuch 33
Tanzer 10
Viking 33
Watkins 33

References

Keelboats
1980s sailboat type designs
Sailing yachts
Sailboat types built by Hunter Marine